Anchor City Rollers is a roller derby league based in Halifax, Nova Scotia, Canada. It is a member of the Women's Flat Track Derby Association (WFTDA).

History
Anchor City Rollers was founded in 2010 as the Halifax Roller Derby Association. Its name was changed to Anchor City Rollers in 2014. In late 2018, the league had roughly 100 members and actively recruits new membership. The league was voted silver for best sports league by readers of The Coast in 2012 and 2015, and gold in 2013, 2014, and 2018. It was nominated for a NS WomenActive Trendsetter Award in 2016.

Anchor City was accepted into the WFTDA Apprentice Program in August 2018. Anchor City was made a full WFTDA member league in February 2019.

References

Roller derby leagues established in 2010
Roller derby in Canada
2010 establishments in Nova Scotia